Parliamentary elections are scheduled to be held in Belarus on 25 February 2024.

Background 

The 2020–2021 Belarusian protests were a series of mass political demonstrations and protests against the Belarusian government and President Alexander Lukashenko.

Electoral system 
The 110 members of the House of Representatives were elected from single-member constituencies by first-past-the-post voting.

Participating parties

References 

Belarus
Parliament
Parliamentary elections in Belarus